Federico Andreotti (6 March 1847 – 1930) was an Italian painter.

Biography
Andreotti was born in Florence. He initially studied with Angiolo Tricca, Stefano Ussi, and at the Florentine Academy of Fine Arts. At a contest, he won a stipend and ultimately gained appointment as professor at the Academy. He was prolific as a painter of canvases at Rome, Florence, and other cities. He painted realistic genre and aristocratic scenes, often in dress from the eighteenth centuries. The elaborate period dress and affected airs give his paintings, sometimes described as Rococo Revival, a retardataire focus.

Among his works are:
I Crapuloni
The Tavern
The Reconciliation
The Music Teacher
A chi dei due
Una battuta de'aspetto
Returning from the Fields 
Half-figure of Old Man
The Grandfather
Interrupted Dance
Countryside Idyll
The Love Letter

Frescos by Andreotti also decorate the interior of the Teatro Mario Del Monaco in Treviso.

References

Federigo Andreotti artworks (paintings, watercolours, drawings), biography, information and signatures

1847 births
1930 deaths
19th-century Italian painters
Italian male painters
20th-century Italian painters
Painters from Tuscany
Italian costume genre painters
19th-century Italian male artists
20th-century Italian male artists